Jiang Ping (born 1930) is a Chinese legal scholar.  He was the President of China University of Political Science and Law, and a member of the Standing Committee of the National People's Congress.

Biography
Jiang Ping was born in Ningbo, Zhejiang Province, on December 12, 1930.  He was admitted to Yenching University in 1948 and in 1951, he went to Soviet Union to study law science and graduated from Moscow State University in 1956.  After graduation, Jiang Ping joined the faculty of Beijing College of Political Science and Law.

Jiang became the President of China University of Political Science and Law in 1988. He resigned from the office in 1990 for his pro-student position in the 1989 Tiananmen Square protests and massacre. Now Jiang Ping is the Lifetime Professor of China University Of Political Science And Law, and now his professional affiliations includes the head of Beijing Arbitration Commission, the adviser, the arbitrator, the member of committee of experts of China International Economic and Trade Arbitration Commission. He has been to Belgium, Ghent University, the University of Hong Kong, University of Rome II in Italy, Japan's Aoyama Gakuin University, and Columbia University of the United States to give lectures. He was awarded as an honorary Doctor of Laws the University of Ghent, Belgium, Catholic University of Peru and served as Honorary Professor of Law. He also was awarded the outstanding middle-aged and young experts, the honorary title of outstanding teachers nationwide.

He was a chief expert in making civil code ("General Principles of Civil law"), Administrative Litigation Law, Property Law, Trust Law and other fundamental laws in China during the legislation booming in the 1990s. After leaving off the post as Vice-Chairman of the Law Committee of 7th National People's Congress in 1993, Jiang Ping resumed his professorship in China University of Political Science and Law. He is also regarded as the conscience of China's lawyers due to his consistent efforts in Rule of Law advocacy. Jiang Ping is an expert on civil law, especially Roman law.

References

External links
 Introduction to Jiang Ping

1930 births
Politicians from Ningbo
Living people
Yenching University alumni
Chinese legal scholars
Moscow State University alumni
People's Republic of China politicians from Zhejiang
Educators from Ningbo
Academic staff of China University of Political Science and Law